Saetbyoul Middle School (Korean: 샛별중학교) is a public middle school located in Bundang-gu, Seongnam-si, Gyeonggi Province in South Korea. It was established in 2008 and is scheduled to be closed in 2020.

Uniforms

The dongbok (worn in the colder seasons) is a red stripe blouse with a red plaid skirt for girls, and a blue striped blouse and navy pants for boys. There is a white vest with the Saetbyoul logo and a gray jacket for both genders. The habok(worn in the warmer months) is made up of a white shirt with a blue plaid tie and a blue plaid skirt for girls, and a white shirt with no tie and navy pants for boys. There is also a cardigan, that can be worn at any time.

Facilities

There are over 20 classrooms, and many special classrooms, including two science labs, an English Zone, a gym, a computer lab, an art room, a musical room, a tiny field, and a cafeteria which is unusual in Korean schools.

External links 
 Official Website

Middle schools in South Korea
Schools in Gyeonggi Province
Bundang
Educational institutions established in 2008
2008 establishments in South Korea